Livonia joerinkensi is a species of sea snail, a marine gastropod mollusk in the family Volutidae, the volutes.

Description

Original Description
  (of Cottonia joerinkensi Poppe, 1987) Poppe G. (1987) A novel species of Volutidae from northwestern Australia. Apex 2(3-4): 99–113.

Distribution

References

Volutidae
Gastropods described in 1987